Ormen is a fjord in Peary Land, northern Greenland.  Administratively the fjord belongs to the Northeast Greenland National Park.

Geography
The fjord is located in the eastern part of Hans Egede Land. It opens to the northeast in the middle stretch of the northwestern shore of G.B. Schley Fjord. 

An unnamed river discharges its waters at the head of the fjord. The area is uninhabited.

See also
List of fjords of Greenland
Peary Land

References

External links
Dansk Pearyland Ekspedition. Sidste års meteorologi og topografisk overblik. - Geografisk Tidsskrift, Bind 50 (1950)

Fjords of Greenland
Peary Land